Kylian Prince-Emmanuel Tresor Kouassi (born 18 June 2003) is an English professional footballer who plays as a forward for League Two club Sutton United.

Club career
Kouassi had loan spells at Bedfont Sports, Hampton & Richmond Borough and Chesham United between 2020 and 2022.

He made his Football League debut on 5 March 2022, during Sutton's 3–0 home victory over Rochdale, replacing Omar Bugiel in the 81st minute. He made three further substitute appearances for Sutton during their 2021-2022 EFL League Two season. Koussai scored his first competitive goal on 3 September 2022, coming off the bench in a 2-1 home win over Harrogate Town.

Career statistics

References

External links

2003 births
Living people
English footballers
Association football forwards
Sutton United F.C. players
Bedfont Sports F.C. players
Hampton & Richmond Borough F.C. players
Chesham United F.C. players
Isthmian League players
National League (English football) players
Southern Football League players
English Football League players